An umpire is a person of authority in a number of sports games.

Specific sports umpires include:
Umpire (American football)
Umpire (Australian rules football)
Umpire (baseball)
Umpire (cricket)
Umpire (field hockey)
International Umpire of Sailing
Referee in other sports

Umpire may also refer to:

In geography:
Umpire, Arkansas
Umpire, Missouri

In military:
HMS Umpire, Royal Navy ships

In law:
Umpire (law), an arbitration officer in the United States
Crown Umpire, the chief arbitrator under the British Unemployment Insurance Act of 1911